"Y Sé Que Vas a Llorar" ("And I Know You're Going to Cry") is a song written by Carlos Maria and performed by Mexican American singer Marisela on her studio album Hablemos Claro (1990). The song reached #2 on the Hot Latin Songs chart, with the top position being held off by Ana Gabriel's song "Es Demasiado Tarde". The song was later covered by Puerto Rican merengue singer Manny Manuel on his second studio album Autentico (1996). Manuel's version became his second #1 song on the Tropical Airplay chart.

Charts

Weekly charts

Year-end charts

See also
List of Billboard Tropical Airplay number ones of 1996

References

1990 songs
1990 singles
1996 singles
Marisela songs
Manny Manuel songs
RMM Records singles
Spanish-language songs